The Good Girl is a 2002 American comedy-drama film directed by Miguel Arteta from a script by Mike White. The film stars Jennifer Aniston, Jake Gyllenhaal and John C. Reilly.

The Good Girl premiered at the 2002 Sundance Film Festival, and released to theatres on August 7, 2002, in the United States.

Plot

Justine Last is a depressed thirty-year-old woman living in small town Texas with her  husband Phil, a house painter who spends most of his free time smoking marijuana with his best friend, Bubba. Phil wants to start a family with Justine but she is not yet ready. Justine works at Retail Rodeo, the local big-box store, with cynical and young Cheryl, ditzy and older Gwen in cosmetics, and security guard Corny.

Young, shy Holden is hired as a cashier at work and Justine introduces herself. They start to spend time together, and she confides in him that she feels underappreciated at home. Holden tells Justine about his obsession with J. D. Salinger's novel The Catcher in the Rye, hence his self-assigned first name, from Holden Caulfield.

Holden becomes smitten with Justine, but when he makes a move on her, she rejects him. He writes her a letter in which he says if she does not meet him at 5 p.m. that day, she will never see him again. Though Justine is hesitant at first, she gives in and meets up with Holden at a motel where they have sex, just after leaving Gwen at the hospital after she was Devine there because she got sick and vomited at the store.

Justine's marriage deteriorates as her affair with Holden continues. One night, she spots Bubba's truck in the motel parking lot. Convinced he knows, she tells Holden they must stop for awhile. Justine goes to the hospital where she meets Corny who tells her that Gwen died from eating poisonous blackberries which gave her a parasitic infection. At home, Bubba alludes to her affair. Feeling guilty, Justine suggests to Phil that they attend a church bible study Corny invited them to. Soon after arriving, Justine spots the motel desk clerk, and insists they leave immediately.

Justine speaks to Holden in private at work the following day, explaining she can't see him anymore. Bubba invites Justine to his house and blackmails her into having sex with him. Holden, who was following Justine, sees them through a window.

Holden does not show at work the next day but is drunkenly waiting in Justine's car when her shift ends. He calls her a whore and demands an apology, offering to kill her husband to free her from her marriage. Justine then becomes desperate to extricate herself from their relationship. Talking to his parents, she tells them he is mentally ill, has imagined a romantic liaison between them and suggests Holden be hospitalized. That night after feeling unwell all day, Justine takes a pregnancy test. The results come up positive; Phil is overjoyed but Justine feels uneasy as she doesn't know who the father is.

The following day at work, $15,000 is suspected stolen by Holden. Justine is then interrogated by her boss Jack about their relationship. Holden later brags about the stolen money to her and his plans for them to run away. He tells her to meet him the following morning at a hotel. When Justine gets home, Phil, Bubba, and Bubba's new girlfriend are all waiting to celebrate the baby news. A doctor phones Phil to tell him that his sperm, recently tested for fertility, is "no good". Confused, he protests to the doctor that his wife is pregnant and hangs up. Bubba assures Phil the doctors made a mistake and that "they don't know everything". Phil then asks aloud if this means Justine isn't pregnant.

The next morning, Justine packs a suitcase. Waiting at a traffic light, she assesses whether she should stay or run away with Holden. At Retail Rodeo she tells her manager where Holden is hiding. Later at home, she watches a news report announcing the police have surrounded Holden at the hotel in a standoff that results in his suicide. The next day, Bubba tells Justine that Phil saw the motel room on the credit card statement, and then begs her not to tell Phil about their encounter.  

When Justine arrives home, Phil tearfully asks if she has been having an affair. When she says, "yes", he strikes her. Phil expresses remorse at hitting her and asks if the baby is his.Justine assures him he is the father. Phil still insists on knowing who she had an affair with, and when he asks if it was with Corny the security guard, Justine lies and says yes. At work the next morning, Corny has a bruised face and his arm in a cast. Cheryl informs Justine two guys with baseball bats and face masks beat him up.

As the movie concludes, Justine still works at Retail Rodeo. In a narrated scene, Phil brings the newborn baby to Justine, who is deep in thought in bed. She lovingly holds the baby and the couple seems content.

Cast
 Jennifer Aniston as Justine Last
 Jake Gyllenhaal as Thomas "Holden" Worther
 John C. Reilly as Phil Last
 John Carroll Lynch as Jack Field
 Tim Blake Nelson as Bubba
 Zooey Deschanel as Cheryl
 Mike White as Corny
 Deborah Rush as Gwen Jackson
 Aimee Garcia as Nurse

Critical reception
The Good Girl was well received by most critics. Review aggregator Rotten Tomatoes reports an 82% approval rating, based on reviews from 159 critics. The site's consensus reads, "A dark dramedy with exceptional performances from Jennifer Aniston and Jake Gyllenhaal, The Good Girl is a moving and astute look at the passions of two troubled souls in a small town." Metacritic, which assigns a normalized rating out of 100 to reviews from mainstream critics, calculated a "generally favorable" average score of 71, based on 35 reviews.

Much critical praise went to Jennifer Aniston for her against-type performance. Ella Taylor of LA Weekly opined it is "especially gratifying to see her play a woman who's had it up to here with making nice, and making do." Critic James Berardinelli wrote, "Her performance is forceful and effective - she effortlessly submerges herself into the role, and, after only a moment's hesitation, Aniston has vanished and all that's left is lonely, trapped Justine."

Elvis Mitchell of The New York Times wrote, "It's Ms. Aniston who surprises in The Good Girl. In some ways she may feel as trapped as Justine by playing Rachel Green, the poor little rich daddy's girl of television's Friends. She comes up with an inventively morose physicality for Justine: her arms hang at her sides as though shackled; they're not limp appendages but weighed down with unhappiness. The plucky dream girls she's played in movies like the underseen 1999 classic Office Space are expressive and given to anxious displays of hand waving. But here she articulates Justine's sad tales through a narration that's as affected and misery laden as Holden's ragged, ripped-off fiction."

Writing for DVD Talk, Geoffrey Kleinman said, "There are two things which make The Good Girl work so well: the fantastic script by Mike White, which is smart, funny and honest, and the breakout performance by Jennifer Aniston who simply embodies her character. Whether or not you are a fan of Aniston, you'll appreciate a look at the real depth she has as an actress and I hope to see her in more films that challenge her as an actress."

Roger Ebert gave the film three and a half stars and also praised Aniston's performance, and saying The Good Girl is an "independent film of satiric fire and emotional turmoil".

Accolades

References

External links

 
 
 
 

2000s American films
2000s English-language films
2002 comedy-drama films
2002 films
2002 independent films
Adultery in films
American comedy-drama films
American independent films
English-language comedy-drama films
Films about suicide
Films directed by Miguel Arteta
Films scored by Mark Orton
Films set in Texas
Films with screenplays by Mike White
Fox Searchlight Pictures films